Following is an alphabetical list of Bulgarian painters.

A–M

Gavril Atanasov (1863-1945)
Nikola Avramov (1897-1945)
Ilia Beshkov (1901-1958)
Dora Boneva (born 1936)
Daria Vassilyanska (1928-2017)
Zlatyu Boyadzhiev (1901-1976)
Christo (1935–2020)
Chudomir (1890-1976)
Vladimir Dimitrov (1882-1960) known at "the Master"
Silvia Dimitrova (born 1970)
Nikolay Diulgheroff (1901-1982)
Dimitar Dobrovich (1816-1905)
Stanislav Dospevski (1823-1878)
Ivan Enchev-Vidyu (1882-1936)
Rumen Gasharov (born 1936)
Pencho Georgiev (1900-1940)
Atanas Hranov (born 1961)
Oda Jaune (born 1973)
Ivan Kirkov (1932-2010)
Anastas Konstantinov (1956–2017)
Nadezhda Kouteva
Tsanko Lavrenov (1896-1978)
Nikola Marinov (1879-1948)
Violeta Maslarova (1925-2006)
Dimitre Mehandjiysky (1915-1999)
Angel Metodiev  (1921-1984)
Ivan Milev (1897-1927)
Anton Mitov (1862-1930)
Georgi Mitov (1875-1900)
Ivan Mrkvička (1856-1938)

N–Z

Radi Nedelchev (born 1938)
Ivan Nenov (1902-1997)
Joseph Oberbauer (1853-1926)
Bencho Obreshkov (1899-1970)
George Papazov (1894-1972)
Georgi Janakiev (1941-2018)
Pascin (1885-1930)
Nikolai Pavlovich (1835-1894)
Houben R.T. (born 1970)
Ekaterina Savova-Nenova
Konstantin Shtarkelov (1889-1961)
Alexander Telalim (born 1966) 
Dechko Uzunov (1899-1986)
Daria Vassilyanska (1928–2017)
Jaroslav Věšín (1860-1915)
Keraca Visulčeva (1910-2004)
Hristofor Zhefarovich (c.1690-1753)
Zahari Zograf (1810-1853)

See also

 Culture of Bulgaria 
 List of Bulgarian artists

References

 
Bulgarian
Lists of Bulgarian people by occupation